Preca is a surname. Notable people with the surname include:

 George Preca (1880–1962), Maltese priest and Roman Catholic saint
 Marie Louise Coleiro Preca (born 1958), Maltese politician and President of Malta